Señorita Panamá 2005 the 23rd Annual Señorita Panamá pageant and 40th celebration of the Miss Panama contest, was held in the Centro de Convenciones Vasco Núñez, Ciudad de Panamá, Panama on Saturday 24, September 2005.

About 15 contestants from all over Panamá competed for the prestigious crown. Señorita Panamá 2004, Rosa María Hernández of Los Santos crowned to María Alessandra Mezquita of Panama Centro as the new Señorita Panamá.

This year there was a new change, a day before on Friday 23, was celebrated the final competition entitled "Señorita Panamá Mundo" was announced the winner of the Señorita Panamá Mundo title. Melissa Piedrahita Señorita Panamá World 2003 crowned Anna Isabella Vaprio as her successor at the end of the event.

Fifteen contestants competed for the national title.

Mezquita competed in the Miss Universe 2006, the 55th edition of the Miss Universe pageant, was held at the Shrine Auditorium in, Los Angeles, United States on July 23, 2006.
Vaprio competed in the Miss World 2005,the 55th edition of the Miss World pageant, was held on 10 December 2005 at the Crown of Beauty Theatre in Sanya, China.

Final result

Special awards

Judges
César Evora – actor
Rodolfo Friedmann - singer
Charlie Cuevas
Rogelio González
Lucy Romero
Mónica Naranjo
Carlos Magallón

Contestants
These are the competitors who have been selected this year.

Historical significance
 Panamá Centro placed in the final round for a consecutive year and won the title.

Election Schedule
 Tuesday July 20 final presentation to the press in the Hotel Radisson Decapolis.
 Thursday July 22 competition of interview with the juror.
 Friday 23 Final night, coronation Señorita Panamá to Miss World 2005 and Best National Competition.
 Saturday 24 Final night, coronation Señorita Panamá 2005.

Candidates Notes
Aliana Khan Zambano was Miss Earth Panamá 2001 and participated in the Miss Earth 2001 in University of the Philippines Theater in Quezon City, Philippines on October 28, 2001.
Sorangel Matos Arce represented Panamá at Miss Universe 2007 in Mexico City.
Debbie González was queen of the Panamá City Carnival 2004 and participated in Miss Hawaiian Tropic Panamá.
Nadya Lya Hendricks represented  Panamá in Miss Tourism Queen 2007.

References

External links
  Señorita Panamá official website
 Miss Panamá

Señorita Panamá
2005 beauty pageants